, also known as , Sarkese or Sark-French, is the Norman dialect of the Channel Island of Sark (Bailiwick of Guernsey).

Sercquiais is a descendant of the 16th century Jèrriais used by the original colonists, 40 families mostly from Saint Ouen, Jersey who settled the then uninhabited island, although influenced in the interim by Guernésiais (the dialect of Guernsey). It is also closely related to the now-extinct Auregnais (Alderney) dialect, as well as to Continental Norman. It is still spoken by older inhabitants of the island and most of the local placenames are in Sercquiais.

In former times, there may have been two subdialects of Sercquiais, but today the dialect is relatively homogeneous. The phonology of the language retains features lost in Jèrriais since the 16th century.

Written Sercquiais
Relatively little Sercquiais has been transcribed, and as there is no widely accepted form, it has received a certain amount of stigma as a result. A notable ruler of Sark, Sibyl Hathaway, who was a speaker herself, proclaimed that it could "never be written down", and this perception has continued in the years since.

The earliest published text in Sercquiais so far identified is the Parable of the Sower from the Gospel of Matthew. Prince Louis Lucien Bonaparte, linguist, visited the Channel Islands in September 1862 in order to transcribe samples of the insular language varieties, which he subsequently published in 1863:

Which in the NIV is translated as:
 (3) "[...] A farmer went out to sow his seed.
 (4) As he was scattering the seed, some fell along the path, and the birds came and ate it up.
 (5) Some fell on rocky places, where it did not have much soil. It sprang up quickly, because the soil was shallow.
 (6) But when the sun came up, the plants were scorched, and they withered because they had no root.
 (7) Other seed fell among thorns, which grew up and choked the plants.
 (8) Still other seed fell on good soil, where it produced a crop — a hundred, sixty or thirty times what was sown.
 (9) He who has ears, let him hear."

Present 
By the year 2022 there are 3 native speakers. Czech linguist Martin Neudörfl is trying to preserve the language by encouraging children and teaching them Sarkese. Since 2019 the language has been taught in schools.

Phonology

(Note: Sercquiais not possessing a standard orthography, examples are given according to Liddicoat's Lexicon of Sark Norman French, Munich 2001)

Sercquiais does not have the voiced dental fricative which is such a distinctive characteristic of St. Ouen in Jersey where most of the colonists came from.

Final consonants of masculine nouns in the singular are in free variation with null in all positions except in liaison. Final consonants are usually pronounced at ends of phrases. Final consonants are always lost in plural forms of masculine nouns. For comparison, Jèrriais  is usually pronounced , and the plural has the long vowel as in Sercquiais. It can also therefore be seen that length is phonemic and may denote plurality.

Gemination occurs regularly in verb conjugations and gerunds, as in Jèrriais but in distinction to Guernésiais.

However, Sercquiais does not geminate palatal fricatives, unlike Jèrriais:

In the second half of the 19th century the language changed considerably. We can observe this in the 40 idiolects that can be heard today. An important part of the language is the usage of diphthongs, which affects the pronunciation. It is unclear how words are pronounced because there are many possible ways to pronounce them depending on where they are in the phrase. It is important to codify the language since not even the native speakers follow all the rules.

Conjugation of verbs 
The St. Ouennais origins of Sercquiais can be seen in the 2nd and 3rd person plural forms of the preterite. Sercquiais uses an ending -dr which is typical of the St. Ouennais dialect of Jèrriais, but generally not used elsewhere in Jersey (nor nowadays by younger speakers in St. Ouen).

See also

Norman language

Footnotes

References

 Société Jersiaise
Bailiwick Express. (2021). Unlikely hero saving the language of Sark.
Mgr. Martin Neudörfl (2017), Spelling standardization of Sark-French, Prague

External links
Lé Sèrtchais (including comparative glossary)
Jèrriais and Sercquiais today by Dr Mari C. Jones – from the BBC

Norman language
Sark
Endangered Romance languages
Languages of the Channel Islands